Eastern Promises is a 2007 gangster film directed by David Cronenberg from a screenplay by Steven Knight. The film tells the story of Anna (Naomi Watts), a Russian-British midwife who delivers the baby of a drug-addicted 14-year old Russian prostitute who dies in childbirth. After Anna learns that the teen was forced into prostitution by the Russian Mafia in London, the leader of the Russian gangsters (Armin Mueller-Stahl) threatens the baby's life, and Anna is warned off by his menacing henchman (Viggo Mortensen).

Principal photography began in November 2006, in locations in and around London. The film has been noted for its treatment of the subject of sex trafficking, and for its violence and realistic depiction of Russian career criminals, which includes detailed portrayal of the tattoos which indicate their crimes and criminal status. Eastern Promises received critical acclaim, appearing on several critics' "top 10 films" lists for 2007 and has since become a cult film. The film has won several awards, including the Audience Prize for best film at the Toronto International Film Festival and the Best Actor award for Mortensen at the British Independent Film Awards. The film received twelve Genie Award nominations and three Golden Globe Award nominations. Mortensen was nominated for the Academy Award for Best Actor.

Plot
Anna Khitrova, a midwife at a London hospital, finds a Russian-language diary on the body of Tatiana, a teenage girl who dies in childbirth, and a calling card for the Trans-Siberian Restaurant owned by Semyon, an old vor in the Russian mafia. Anna sets out to track down Tatiana's family so that she can find a home for the baby, and meets with Semyon, who offers to help. Though Anna's mother Helen is open to the idea, Anna's Russian uncle Stepan, a former KGB officer, urges caution, saying that Tatiana was a prostitute. Anna also gives Semyon a photocopy of the diary.

Semyon's driver, Nikolai Luzhin, serves as the family "cleaner" and bodyguard of Kirill, Semyon's son. Kirill, a drunk who repeatedly disappoints Semyon, authorizes an ill-advised hit on a rival Chechen leader with the help of a Kurdish associate, Azim, and without Semyon's approval. Kirill spits on the dead Chechen's body, calling him a pederast, but Nikolai later tells Semyon that the Chechen had been spreading rumors that Kirill was gay. Nikolai removes identifying evidence from the Chechen's body and dumps it in the River Thames.

When Stepan finishes translating Tatiana's diary, Anna learns that Semyon raped Tatiana after Kirill failed to do so, explaining that he would show Kirill how to "break" her. The diary also states that Semyon gave her pills to induce an abortion, and Anna realizes that the baby was fathered by Semyon. Meanwhile, Semyon realizes that Anna knows the truth about the baby and visits her at the hospital. He strikes a deal wherein he will give the location of the girl's family to Anna if she returns the diary. Later, Anna, Helen and Stepan meet Nikolai in a fast food restaurant, where Nikolai takes the diary but denies knowing anything about the deal. Semyon then orders Nikolai to kill Stepan, saying that a Russian cannot be trusted with the information, and Stepan soon goes missing.

As Nikolai rises in rank, Semyon sponsors him as a full member, due in part to Nikolai's protection of Kirill. Meanwhile, the dead Chechen's brothers arrive in London seeking vengeance, and kill Azim's mentally handicapped nephew, whom Azim had forced to kill the Chechen. Azim confesses his role in the hit to Semyon, and Semyon forgives him in exchange for participating in a plan to fool the Chechens: Azim is to lure Nikolai into a meeting at a bath house where he will be ambushed by the Chechens, who believe that he is Kirill. Though the Chechens seriously wound him, Nikolai manages to kill them both before being taken to Anna's hospital.

Yuri, a high-ranking Scotland Yard officer with responsibility for the Russian mafia, meets Nikolai in the hospital, revealing that Nikolai is actually an undercover FSB agent working under license from the British government. Nikolai tells Yuri to have Semyon arrested for statutory rape, with a paternity test of Tatiana's baby as evidence, which will also allow Nikolai to take over the mafia. Anna confronts Nikolai in his hospital bed, and he tells her that Stepan is safe, in a 5-star hotel in Edinburgh where Nikolai sent him for his own protection. She then spots Kirill entering a lift and finds that Tatiana's baby is gone, replaced with a bouquet of roses. She and Nikolai then rush to the spot on the Thames where Nikolai had previously disposed of the Chechen's body and find Kirill sitting by the river, working up the courage to throw his baby sister. Nikolai and Anna persuade him to give the baby back, and Nikolai embraces Kirill, telling him that Semyon is finished, and that they will now be bosses together. Soon after, Nikolai succeeds Semyon as head of the organization, and Anna gains custody of Tatiana's baby, whom she names Christine.

Cast

Production

Filming
Shooting began in November 2006, and various scenes were filmed in St John Street, Farringdon, London. Filming also took place in Broadway Market, Hackney and in Brompton Cemetery in the London Borough of Kensington & Chelsea. The "Trans-Siberian Restaurant" is located in The Farmiloe Building, 34 St John Street, next to Smithfield Market. This is the 6th most popular film and TV location in London, having also been used for Spooks, Penelope and Batman Begins. When Anna, her mother Helen, and her uncle Stepan meet Nikolai at a fast food restaurant, this was filmed in Bermondsey, south-east London at a Wimpy bar.

The entrance to the "Ankara Social Club" of the film is actually the front door of a residential flat. The Broadway Market hair dresser known as "Broadway Gents Hairstylist" was changed to "Azim's Hair Salon", where in the film one of the Russians is murdered. The owner Mr. Ismail Yesiloglu decided to keep most of the shop front after filming. In the original script, the name was "Ozim's Hair Salon", but it was later changed to "Azim's" as there is no such name as Ozim in Turkish. The "Trafalgar Hospital" is actually the Middlesex Hospital, a hospital in the Fitzrovia area of London, which closed to patients in December 2005. The building in central London, which was knocked down in 2008, had the inscription 'Trafalgar Hospital', matching the style and apparent age of the old Middlesex Hospital, inserted into the legend above the main door. The fight scene in the Turkish Baths was filmed on a custom set based on the Ironmonger Row Baths in Islington.

Eastern Promises was David Cronenberg's first film to be shot entirely outside Canada.

Tattoos

Viggo Mortensen studied Russian gangsters and their tattoos. Mortensen spent a lot of time with a Russian Mafia specialist, Gilly McKenzie (organised crime specialist for the UN) and also consulted a documentary on the subject called The Mark of Cain (2000). The tattoos that he wore, according to the New York Daily News, were so realistic that diners in a Russian restaurant in London fell silent out of fear, until Mortensen revealed his identity and admitted the tattoos were for a film. From that day on he washed off his tattoos whenever he went off the set. Mortensen said of the significance of the tattoos:

I talked to them [authentic gangsters and Gilly McKenzie] about what they meant and where they were on the body, what that said about where they'd been, what their specialties were, what their ethnic and geographical affiliations were. Basically their history, their calling card, is their body.

Violence
Consistent with the trademark violence in much of Cronenberg's work, Eastern Promises features a graphically violent fight scene in a steam bath where the combatants wield linoleum knives. When asked in an interview about the difference between "gun violence" and "knife violence," Cronenberg replied, "We have no guns in this movie. There were no guns in the script. The choice of those curved knives we use in the steam bath was mine. They're not some kind of exotic Turkish knives, they're linoleum knives. I felt that these guys could walk around in the streets with these knives, and if they were ever caught, they could say 'we're linoleum cutters'."

Director's commentary
Adam Nayman of Eye Weekly reported that director Cronenberg said "just don't give the plot away" and Nayman wrote "his request is understandable." Nayman said "there is one scene – the in-depth discussion of which prompted the director's anti-spoiler request referenced at the top of this story – that should rank not only in his personal pantheon of spectacularly deployed gore but among the most exhilaratingly visceral patches of cinema, period, full stop." Chicago Sun-Times critic Roger Ebert noted Cronenberg's quote and agreed, saying: "He is correct that it would be fatal, because this is not a movie of what or how, but of why. And for a long time you don't see the why coming."

Release
The film premiered on September 8, 2007, at the 2007 Toronto International Film Festival where it won the Audience Prize for best film on September 15, 2007. Eastern Promises opened in limited release in Russia on September 13, 2007.

In the United States and Canada, the film opened in limited release in 15 theaters on September 14, 2007, and grossed $547,092 — averaging $36,472 per theater. The film opened in wide release in the United States and Canada on September 21, 2007, (expanding to 1,404 theaters) and ranked #5 at the box office, grossing $5,659,133 — an average of $4,030 per theater. The film has grossed $56,106,607 worldwide as of March 17, 2019 — $17,266,000 in the United States and Canada and $38,840,607 in other territories.

The film took part in competition at the San Sebastian Film Festival September 20, 2007. The film was shown at the London Film Festival on October 17, 2007, and was released in the United Kingdom on October 26, 2007.

Reception
The review aggregator Rotten Tomatoes reported that 89% based on 200 reviews, with an average rating 7.64/10. The website's critical consensus reads, "David Cronenberg triumphs again, showcasing the Viggo Mortensen's onscreen prowess in a daring performance. Bearing the trademarks of psychological drama and gritty violence, Eastern Promises is a very compelling crime story." On Metacritic, the film has a weighted average score of 82 out of 100, based on 35 critics, indicating "universal acclaim".

Todd McCarthy of Variety, David Elliott of The San Diego Union-Tribune, and film critic Tony Medley noted the twists in the film. Roger Ebert of the Chicago Sun-Times gave the film four out of four stars and wrote "Eastern Promises is no ordinary crime thriller, just as Cronenberg is no ordinary director", and said that "Cronenberg has moved film by film into the top rank of directors, and here he wisely reunites with Mortensen" who "digs so deeply into the role you may not recognize him at first." Ebert said the film has a fight scene that "sets the same kind of standard that The French Connection set for chases. Years from now, it will be referred to as a benchmark."

J. Hoberman of The Village Voice said "I've said it before and hope to again: David Cronenberg is the most provocative, original, and consistently excellent North American director of his generation." Hoberman said the film is "directed with considerable formal intelligence and brooding power" and continues the trend of "murderous family dramas" seen in Spider and A History of Violence. Hoberman called the film "graphic but never gratuitous in its violence", "garish yet restrained", "a masterful mood piece", "deceptively generic" and said the film "suggests a naturalized version of the recent Russian horror flick Night Watch." When describing the cast, Hoberman said "Mueller-Stahl may be perfunctory ... but Vincent Cassel literally flings himself into [his role]" and "Mortensen is even more electrifying as Nikolai than in A History of Violence".

Chris Vognar of The Dallas Morning News gave the film a "B+" and said "The film's genius performance belongs to the venerable Armin Mueller-Stahl, who plays the family head with a twinkling eye and an air of avuncular, Old World charm." Vognar wrote "Where some may see melodrama, Mr. Cronenberg locates timeless, elemental struggles between good and evil, right and wrong. But he makes sure to place a mysterious gray area front and center, personified here by Mr. Mortensen's Nikolai", writing "Nikolai Luzhin is ... like Ray Bradbury's Illustrated Man ... only more dangerous" and "scarily enigmatic." Vognar wrote that Eastern Promises shares themes of "ambiguous identity and rage-soaked duality" with A History of Violence and said both films "have a lock-step precision and both take a sly kind of joy in subverting genre expectations." Vognar said Eastern Promises "is a little too mechanical for its own good ... but the mechanics also produce an admirable crispness and sense of purpose, a sense that the man behind the camera knows exactly what he's doing at all times."

Film Journal International critic Doris Toumarkine said the film is a "highly entertaining but sometimes revolting look at a particularly venal branch of the Russian mob." Toumarkine wrote that Mortensen and Watts "are intriguing moral counterpoints. They are also the key ingredients that make Eastern Promises a highly delectable and cinematically rich borsht that upscale film fans will devour." She described Mortensen's performance as "startling," called Watts "touching," Cassel "particularly delicious," but said "Mueller-Stahl, Cusack, and Skolimowski don't have as much to chew on." She said the film "is also blessed by Howard Shore's restrained score, which lets the film's other estimable elements breathe through." Toumarkine also said the film is "essentially a character-driven crime thriller but is also a bloody tour de force laced with considerable nudity and sexually bold content that will rattle the squeamish."

Bruce Westbrook of the Houston Chronicle gave the film one star out of four and said it had a "contrived plot" and wrote "what it's really about, more than sensitivity for displaced people or social analyses, is violence — hideous, gruesome, over-the-top violence." Westbrook said "For Cronenberg, such cheap sensationalism is business as usual, and this far into his career, that business has slipped into artistic bankruptcy." Westbrook wrote the film "isn't about Russian gangs so much as Cronenberg's own dark passions not just for violence but excruciating carnage, which he brandishes mercilessly" and that the film was "a stifling descent into grim shock and disturbing awe."

Awards and nominations
Eastern Promises won the Audience Prize for best film on September 15, 2007 at the 2007 Toronto International Film Festival. The film received three Golden Globe nominations for the 65th Golden Globe Awards, being nominated for Best Motion Picture - Drama, Best Original Score and a Best Actor – Motion Picture Drama nomination for Mortensen, but the film failed to win any. The film was nominated in five different categories in the British Independent Film Awards for 2007, and won in one category: Best Performance by an Actor in a British Independent Film (for Mortensen).

Mortensen was also nominated for Academy Award for Best Actor at the 80th Academy Awards, but told the Associated Press: "If there's a strike I will not go." — a reference to the ongoing Writers Guild of America strike. On February 12, 2008, the strike ended, and he attended the ceremony, although he lost the award to Daniel Day-Lewis for There Will Be Blood. Eastern Promises received twelve nominations at the 28th Genie Awards, tying with the film Shake Hands with the Devil for most nominations, and won seven, Best Supporting Actor (Mueller-Stahl), Screenplay, Cinematography, Editing, Musical Score, Overall Sound, Sound Editing. It was also the last TIFF People's Choice Award winner to not win any of its Oscar nominations until Steven Spielberg's The Fabelmans in 2022.

Top ten lists
The film appeared on many critics' top ten lists of the best films of 2007.

 1st — Marc Doyle, Metacritic.com
 2nd — J. Hoberman, The Village Voice
 4th — Manohla Dargis, The New York Times (tied with Colossal Youth)
 4th — Peter Travers, Rolling Stone
 4th — Steven Rea, The Philadelphia Inquirer
 5th — Frank Scheck, The Hollywood Reporter
 7th — Liam Lacey & Rick Groen, The Globe and Mail
 7th — Scott Foundas, LA Weekly (tied with Before the Devil Knows You're Dead)
 8th — Desson Thomson, The Washington Post
 9th — Nathan Lee, The Village Voice
 9th — Shawn Levy, The Oregonian
 10th — Jack Mathews, New York Daily News
 10th — Marjorie Baumgarten, The Austin Chronicle

Cancelled sequel
Speaking in August 2010, Cassel said that a sequel was discussed with Cronenberg whilst they were filming A Dangerous Method. Cassel suggested that the sequel will be filmed in Russia with Cassel and Mortensen reprising their roles. In April 2012, producer Paul Webster told Screen International that a sequel was in the works, which would reunite director Cronenberg, writer Knight, and actor Mortensen. The film was said to be made by Webster's new production company Shoebox Films in collaboration with Focus Features and was to begin production in early 2013. That August, however, Cronenberg stated that Eastern Promises 2 was "dead": "We were supposed to start shooting 'Eastern Promises 2' in October ... [But] It's done. If you don't like it talk to James Schamus at Focus. It was his decision." On December 2, 2020, Knight revealed that the sequel became the upcoming separate Martin Zandvliet film Small Dark Look starring Jason Statham.

References

External links

 
 
 
 
 David Cronenberg's Preparation for Directing Eastern Promises, an Amazon.com reference list

Interviews
 Film Comment interview with David Cronenberg
 Village Voice interview with Cronenberg 
 GreenCine Daily interviews Cronenberg & Viggo Mortensen
 Viggo Mortensen interview
 Rotten Tomatoes Interview with Cronenberg and Mortensen 2007
 Interview about Eastern Promises for SBIFF at UCSB

2007 films
2007 crime thriller films
British crime thriller films
Canadian crime thriller films
Alliance Films films
BBC Film films
Serendipity Point Films films
Films scored by Howard Shore
Films about the Russian Mafia
Films directed by David Cronenberg
Films set in London
Films shot in London
Human trafficking in the United Kingdom
Film controversies in the United Kingdom
2000s English-language films
English-language Canadian films
2000s Russian-language films
Ukrainian-language films
Films with screenplays by Steven Knight
Films about child abduction
Films about child prostitution
Films about human trafficking
Films about the Federal Security Service
Toronto International Film Festival People's Choice Award winners
Works about sex trafficking
2007 multilingual films
British multilingual films
Canadian multilingual films
2000s Canadian films
2000s British films
Canadian gangster films